Neotibicen robinsonianus, commonly called Robinson's cicada, is a species of large bodied annual cicada in the genus Neotibicen. It is native to the Eastern United States.

References

Hemiptera of North America
Insects described in 1922
Cryptotympanini